The 1987–88 New York Knicks season was the 42nd season for the team in the National Basketball Association (NBA). Early in the season, the Knicks signed free agent and second-year forward Johnny Newman. The Knicks finished the regular season with a 38–44 record, and qualified for the 1988 NBA Playoffs. In the first round of the playoffs, New York lost a best-of-five series to the Boston Celtics, 3–1. Following the season, Bill Cartwright was traded to the Chicago Bulls. First-round draft pick Mark Jackson was named Rookie of the Year.

The season was the first in which the Knicks were coached by Rick Pitino, who had been hired after leading Providence to the Final Four of the 1987 NCAA Division I men's basketball tournament.

Draft picks

Note: This is not an extensive list; it only covers the first round and notable post-first-round picks.

Roster

Regular season

Season standings

z – clinched division title
y – clinched division title
x – clinched playoff spot

Record vs. opponents

Game log

Regular season

|- style="background:#fcc;"
| 1 || November 6, 19877:30 PM EST || @ Detroit
| L 99–110
|
|
|
| Pontiac Silverdome28,676
| 0–1
|- style="background:#fcc;"
| 2 || November 7, 1987 || @ Indiana
| 95–108
|
|
|
| Market Square Arena
| 0–2
|- style="background:#fcc;"
| 3 || November 9, 1987 || Boston
| 87–96
|
|
|
| Madison Square Garden
| 0–3
|- style="background:#fcc;"
| 4 || November 11, 1987 || Atlanta
| 93–94
|
|
|
| Madison Square Garden
| 0–4
|- style="background:#fcc;"
| 5 || November 13, 1987 || @ Washington
| 101–108
|
|
|
| Capital Centre
| 0–5
|- style="background:#cfc;"
| 6 || November 14, 1987 || Milwaukee
| 93–89
|
|
|
| Madison Square Garden
| 1–5
|- style="background:#fcc;"
| 7 || November 18, 1987 || @ Boston
| 109–111 (2 OT)
|
|
|
| Boston Garden
| 1–6
|- style="background:#fcc;"
| 8 || November 19, 1987 || @ New Jersey
| 107–108
|
|
|
| Brendan Byrne Arena
| 1–7
|- style="background:#cfc;"
| 9 || November 21, 1987 || Golden State
| 99–91
|
|
|
| Madison Square Garden
| 2–7
|- style="background:#fcc;"
| 10 || November 23, 1987 || San Antonio
| 112–117
|
|
|
| Madison Square Garden
| 2–8
|- style="background:#cfc;"
| 11 || November 25, 1987 || @ Cleveland
| 104–101
|
|
|
| Richfield Coliseum
| 3–8
|- style="background:#cfc;"
| 12 || November 28, 1987 || Cleveland
| 105–93
|
|
|
| Madison Square Garden
| 4–8

|- style="background:#fcc;"
| 13 || December 1, 1987 || Seattle
| 109–112
|
|
|
| Madison Square Garden
| 4–9
|- style="background:#fcc;"
| 14 || December 3, 1987 || @ Phoenix
| 114–120
|
|
|
| Arizona Veterans Memorial Coliseum
| 4–10
|- style="background:#fcc;"
| 15 || December 4, 1987 || @ Utah
| 92–104
|
|
|
| Salt Palace
| 4–11
|- style="background:#fcc;"
| 16 || December 6, 1987 || @ Portland
| 99–117
|
|
|
| Memorial Coliseum
| 4–12
|- style="background:#cfc;"
| 17 || December 8, 1987 || Washington
| 116–92
|
|
|
| Madison Square Garden
| 5–12
|- style="background:#cfc;"
| 18 || December 10, 1987 || Denver
| 113–97
|
|
|
| Madison Square Garden
| 6–12
|- style="background:#fcc;"
| 19 || December 12, 19877:30 PM EST || @ Detroit
| L 96–124
|
|
|
| Pontiac Silverdome21,368
| 6–13
|- style="background:#fcc;"
| 20 || December 15, 1987 || Milwaukee
| 98–103
|
|
|
| Madison Square Garden
| 6–14
|- style="background:#fcc;"
| 21 || December 17, 1987 || Philadelphia
| 96–106
|
|
|
| Madison Square Garden
| 6–15
|- style="background:#cfc;"
| 22 || December 19, 1987 || New Jersey
| 125–93
|
|
|
| Madison Square Garden
| 7–15
|- style="background:#fcc;"
| 23 || December 22, 1987 || @ Milwaukee
| 102–122
|
|
|
| MECCA Arena
| 7–16
|- style="background:#cfc;"
| 24 || December 23, 1987 || Chicago
| 90–89
|
|
|
| Madison Square Garden
| 8–16
|- style="background:#fcc;"
| 25 || December 25, 198712 Noon EST || Detroit
| L 87–91
|
|
|
| Madison Square Garden14,549
| 8–17
|- style="background:#fcc;"
| 26 || December 26, 1987 || @ Atlanta
| 98–125
|
|
|
| The Omni
| 8–18
|- style="background:#cfc;"
| 27 || December 29, 1987 || Portland
| 123–110
|
|
|
| Madison Square Garden
| 9–18

|- style="background:#cfc;"
| 28 || January 1, 1988 || L.A. Clippers
| 115–96
|
|
|
| Madison Square Garden
| 10–18
|- style="background:#fcc;"
| 29 || January 5, 1988 || Phoenix
| 95–100
|
|
|
| Madison Square Garden
| 10–19
|- style="background:#fcc;"
| 30 || January 6, 1988 || @ Boston
| 108–117
|
|
|
| Boston Garden
| 10–20
|- style="background:#fcc;"
| 31 || January 8, 1988 || @ New Jersey
| 111–118
|
|
|
| Brendan Byrne Arena
| 10–21
|- style="background:#cfc;"
| 32 || January 9, 1988 || Boston
| 106–98
|
|
|
| Madison Square Garden
| 11–21
|- style="background:#fcc;"
| 33 || January 12, 1988 || @ Cleveland
| 111–119
|
|
|
| Richfield Coliseum
| 11–22
|- style="background:#fcc;"
| 34 || January 15, 1988 || @ Philadelphia
| 104–119
|
|
|
| The Spectrum
| 11–23
|- style="background:#cfc;"
| 35 || January 16, 1988 || Philadelphia
| 110–96
|
|
|
| Madison Square Garden
| 12–23
|- style="background:#cfc;"
| 36 || January 18, 1988 || Atlanta
| 110–102
|
|
|
| Madison Square Garden
| 13–23
|- style="background:#fcc;"
| 37 || January 20, 1988 || @ Seattle
| 96–108
|
|
|
| Seattle Center Coliseum
| 13–24
|- style="background:#fcc;"
| 38 || January 22, 198810:30 PM EST || @ L.A. Lakers
| L 112–113
|
|
|
| The Forum17,505
| 13–25
|- style="background:#fcc;"
| 39 || January 23, 1988 || @ Sacramento
| 94–97
|
|
|
| ARCO Arena
| 13–26
|- style="background:#cfc;"
| 40 || January 26, 1988 || New Jersey
| 122–101
|
|
|
| Madison Square Garden
| 14–26
|- style="background:#fcc;"
| 41 || January 28, 1988 || @ Washington
| 90–104
|
|
|
| Capital Centre
| 14–27
|- style="background:#fcc;"
| 42 || January 30, 1988 || @ Chicago
| 95–97 (OT)
|
|
|
| Chicago Stadium
| 14–28

|- style="background:#cfc;"
| 43 || February 2, 1988 || Washington
| 110–106
|
|
|
| Madison Square Garden
| 15–28
|- style="background:#cfc;"
| 44 || February 4, 19887:30 PM EST || Detroit
| W 100–93
|
|
|
| Madison Square Garden14,363
| 16–28
|- style="background:#fcc"
| 45 || February 10, 19887:30 PM EST || @ Detroit
| L 87–98
|
|
|
| Pontiac Silverdome19,160
| 16–29
|- style="background:#cfc;"
| 46 || February 13, 1988 || Cleveland
| 120–103
|
|
|
| Madison Square Garden
| 17–29
|- style="background:#cfc;"
| 47 || February 15, 1988 || New Jersey
| 97–96
|
|
|
| Madison Square Garden
| 18–29
|- style="background:#fcc;"
| 48 || February 16, 1988 || @ Indiana
| 104–117
|
|
|
| Market Square Arena
| 18–30
|- style="background:#cfc;"
| 49 || February 18, 1988 || Sacramento
| 108–104
|
|
|
| Madison Square Garden
| 19–30
|- style="background:#fcc;"
| 50 || February 22, 1988 || @ Boston
| 93–95
|
|
|
| Hartford Civic Center
| 19–31
|- style="background:#cfc;"
| 51 || February 23, 1988 || Milwaukee
| 89–87
|
|
|
| Madison Square Garden
| 20–31
|- style="background:#cfc;"
| 52 || February 25, 1988 || @ L.A. Clippers
| 106–96
|
|
|
| Los Angeles Memorial Sports Arena
| 21–31
|- style="background:#cfc;"
| 53 || February 26, 1988 || @ Golden State
| 125–119
|
|
|
| Oakland-Alameda County Coliseum Arena
| 22–31
|- style="background:#fcc;"
| 54 || February 28, 1988 || @ Denver
| 100–109
|
|
|
| McNichols Sports Arena
| 22–32

|- style="background:#cfc;"
| 55 || March 1, 1988 || Indiana
| 98–96
|
|
|
| Madison Square Garden
| 23–32
|- style="background:#cfc;"
| 56 || March 4, 1988 || Philadelphia
| 110–108 (OT)
|
|
|
| Madison Square Garden
| 24–32
|- style="background:#fcc;"
| 57 || March 5, 1988 || @ New Jersey
| 85–94
|
|
|
| Brendan Byrne Arena
| 24–33
|- style="background:#cfc;"
| 58 || March 7, 1988 || Chicago
| 110–98
|
|
|
| Madison Square Garden
| 25–33
|- style="background:#fcc;"
| 59 || March 9, 19888:00 PM EST || L.A. Lakers
| L 99–104
|
|
|
| Madison Square Garden19,591
| 25–34
|- style="background:#fcc;"
| 60 || March 11, 1988 || @ Atlanta
| 115–122
|
|
|
| The Omni
| 25–35
|- style="background:#cfc;"
| 61 || March 12, 1988 || Utah
| 108–105
|
|
|
| Madison Square Garden
| 26–35
|- style="background:#cfc;"
| 62 || March 14, 1988 || Cleveland
| 104–102
|
|
|
| Madison Square Garden
| 27–35
|- style="background:#fcc;"
| 63 || March 16, 1988 || @ Philadelphia
| 108–115
|
|
|
| The Spectrum
| 27–36
|- style="background:#cfc;"
| 64 || March 19, 1988 || Atlanta
| 116–110
|
|
|
| Madison Square Garden
| 28–36
|- style="background:#cfc;"
| 65 || March 21, 1988 || @ San Antonio
| 133–121
|
|
|
| HemisFair Arena
| 29–36
|- style="background:#fcc;"
| 66 || March 22, 1988 || @ Dallas
| 105–124
|
|
|
| Reunion Arena
| 29–37
|- style="background:#fcc;"
| 67 || March 24, 1988 || @ Houston
| 117–134
|
|
|
| The Summit
| 29–38
|- style="background:#fcc;"
| 68 || March 26, 1988 || Boston
| 106–118
|
|
|
| Madison Square Garden
| 29–39
|- style="background:#cfc;"
| 69 || March 28, 1988 || Dallas
| 114–106
|
|
|
| Madison Square Garden
| 30–39
|- style="background:#fcc;"
| 70 || March 29, 1988 || @ Cleveland
| 103–108
|
|
|
| Richfield Coliseum
| 30–40
|- style="background:#cfc;"
| 71 || March 31, 1988 || @ Milwaukee
| 113–103
|
|
|
| MECCA Arena
| 31–40

|- style="background:#cfc;"
| 72 || April 2, 1988 || Houston
| 104–98
|
|
|
| Madison Square Garden
| 32–40
|- style="background:#cfc;"
| 73 || April 5, 1988 || @ Philadelphia
| 136–119
|
|
|
| The Spectrum
| 33–40
|- style="background:#fcc;"
| 74 || April 8, 1988 || @ Chicago
| 122–131
|
|
|
| Chicago Stadium
| 33–41
|- style="background:#cfc;"
| 75 || April 10, 1988 || @ Washington
| 118–98
|
|
|
| Capital Centre
| 34–41
|- style="background:#cfc;"
| 76 || April 11, 19887:30 PM EDT || Detroit
| W 114–111 (OT)
|
|
|
| Madison Square Garden13,312
| 35–41
|- style="background:#cfc;"
| 77 || April 13, 1988 || Indiana
| 127–107
|
|
|
| Madison Square Garden
| 36–41
|- style="background:#fcc;"
| 78 || April 15, 1988 || Washington
| 97–106
|
|
|
| Madison Square Garden
| 36–42
|- style="background:#cfc;"
| 79 || April 16, 1988 || @ Atlanta
| 95–93
|
|
|
| The Omni
| 37–42
|- style="background:#fcc;"
| 80 || April 19, 1988 || Chicago
| 118–121
|
|
|
| Madison Square Garden
| 37–43
|- style="background:#fcc;"
| 81 || April 22, 1988 || @ Milwaukee
| 109–118
|
|
|
| MECCA Arena
| 37–44
|- style="background:#cfc;"
| 82 || April 23, 1988 || @ Indiana
| 88–86
|
|
|
| Market Square Arena
| 38–44

Playoffs

|- align="center" bgcolor="#ffcccc"
| 1
| April 29
| @ Boston
| L 92–112
| Gerald Wilkins (24)
| Ewing, Green (11)
| Mark Jackson (9)
| Boston Garden14,890
| 0–1
|- align="center" bgcolor="#ffcccc"
| 2
| May 1
| @ Boston
| L 102–128
| Gerald Wilkins (24)
| Patrick Ewing (10)
| Mark Jackson (7)
| Boston Garden14,890
| 0–2
|- align="center" bgcolor="#ccffcc"
| 3
| May 2
| Boston
| W 109–100
| Johnny Newman (34)
| Patrick Ewing (10)
| Mark Jackson (14)
| Madison Square Garden19,591
| 1–2
|- align="center" bgcolor="#ffcccc"
| 4
| May 14
| Boston
| L 94–102
| Mark Jackson (28)
| Patrick Ewing (20)
| Mark Jackson (9)
| Madison Square Garden19,591
| 1–3
|-

Player statistics

Season

Playoffs

Awards and records
Mark Jackson, NBA Rookie of the Year Award
Patrick Ewing, All-NBA Second Team
Patrick Ewing, NBA All-Defensive Second Team
Mark Jackson, NBA All-Rookie Team 1st Team

Transactions

References

New York Knicks seasons
New York Knick
New York Knicks
New York Knicks
1980s in Manhattan
Madison Square Garden